Events from 2019 in Algeria.

Incumbents 
 President: Abdelaziz Bouteflika
 Prime Minister:
 Ahmed Ouyahia (until March 11)
 Noureddine Bedoui (March 12-December 19)
 Sabri Boukadoum, acting (December 19-December 28)
 Abdelaziz Djerad (from December 28)

Events 

 March 2 - Tens of thousands of Algerians demonstrate in the streets against President Bouteflika's bid for reelection for a fifth term, with 183 injured.
 March 11 - President Bouteflika announces he will not seek a fifth term in office and postpones the election with no date given. Prime Minister Ouyahia also resigns and is replaced by Noureddine Bedoui.
 March 14 - Protests continue as some see the postponement of the election as the President extending his rule.

Deaths 

23 December – Ahmed Gaid Salah, military chief.

References

 
Algeria
Algeria
Years of the 21st century in Algeria